Amietia vertebralis, also known as Maluti river frog, aquatic river frog, ice frog, large-mouthed frog, or water frog, is a species of frogs in the family Pyxicephalidae. It is an aquatic high-altitude species found in Lesotho and neighbouring South Africa.

Description
It is dark brown with a very warty skin and a somewhat squat appearance. Its belly and insides of legs are white with a dark reticulation. The toes have extensive webbing.

The body, tail, and fins are darkly mottled.

Habitat and ecology
It is a water-dependent and largely aquatic species that can stay underwater for long periods (up to 30 hours); during the winter months, it can be seen swimming under ice, although tadpoles can sometimes get trapped in ice. Breeding occurs during the warmer time of the year. Males calling submerged or with just the head protruding. Eggs are deposited in large clutches that become attached to sunken vegetation. Tadpoles and juveniles spend more time closer to the surface and in shallower pools than adults. Freshwater crabs form a large part of its diet.

Conservation
It is a locally abundant species that is typically associated with pristine areas, although it can also occur in polluted sites. It can be locally be threatened by afforestation, dam building, and overgrazing (which causes siltation of rivers). Other potential threats include chytridiomycosis and introduced fish such as trout. Its use in local traditional medicine for treating burns is probably not occurring at a level that could constitute a threat to the species. It is present in a number of protected areas in both Lesotho and South Africa.

References

vertebralis
Frogs of Africa
Vertebrates of Lesotho
Amphibians of South Africa
Taxa named by John Hewitt (herpetologist)
Amphibians described in 1927
Taxonomy articles created by Polbot